Bailya  weberi is a species of sea snail, a marine gastropod mollusc in the family Pisaniidae.

Description

Distribution
This species occurs in the Caribbean Sea off Cuba and the Florida Keys.

References

 Rosenberg, G., F. Moretzsohn, and E. F. García. 2009. Gastropoda (Mollusca) of the Gulf of Mexico, Pp. 579–699 in Felder, D.L. and D.K. Camp (eds.), Gulf of Mexico–Origins, Waters, and Biota. Biodiversity. Texas A&M Press, College Station, Texas.

External links

Pisaniidae
Gastropods described in 1983